Richard Newcome (Newcombe) (1701 – 3 June 1769) was an English bishop of Llandaff and bishop of St Asaph.

Life
He was the sixth son of Peter Newcome, vicar of Aldenham, Hertfordshire. He was admitted to Queens' College, Cambridge in 1718, matriculating in 1719, and graduating B.A. 1722, M.A. 1725, and D.D. 1746. He became a Fellow of Queens' and then vicar of Hursley, Hampshire in 1726 .

He was rector of St Botolph's Church, Cambridge, in 1727. Subsequently he was chaplain to George II. From 1746 he was rector of Whitchurch, Shropshire, and from 1755 canon of Windsor. He was bishop of Llandaff from 1755 and was translated to St Asaph in 1761.

He died at Bath, Somerset on 3 June 1769.

References
 

1701 births
1769 deaths
Bishops of Llandaff
Bishops of St Asaph
Alumni of Queens' College, Cambridge
Fellows of Queens' College, Cambridge
Canons of Windsor
18th-century Welsh Anglican bishops